Agnes Canta (14 November 1888 – 8 August 1964) was a Dutch painter. Her work was part of the painting event in the art competition at the 1932 Summer Olympics.

References

1888 births
1964 deaths
20th-century Dutch painters
Dutch women painters
Olympic competitors in art competitions
Painters from Rotterdam
20th-century Dutch women